Irish Remonstrance may refer to
 Irish Remonstrance of 1317
 Peter Valesius Walsh's Remonstrance of the 1640s